Hector Wright (born 8 May 1969) is a Jamaican former professional footballer who played as a midfielder.

Club career
Wright played for Seba United in his native country, but his career was cut short by injuries. He also has an older brother, Chadwick 'Shaggy' Wright that played club football. In 1997, he played for the Long Island Rough Riders in the USISL A-League.

International career
Wright made his debut for the Jamaica national team in 1988 against Canada and, according to the Jamaica Football Federation, Wright earned 110 caps (16 goals) for his country. This figure has however not been officially acknowledged by FIFA, because the JFF includes all matches, even against club sides, youth or Olympic team. Wright also skippered the Reggae Boyz, he played his last international in 1997 against Costa Rica.

Career statistics
Scores and results list Jamaica's goal tally first.

References

External links

Living people
1969 births
Jamaican footballers
Association football midfielders
Jamaica international footballers
National Premier League players
A-League (1995–2004) players
Long Island Rough Riders players
Montego Bay United F.C. players
1991 CONCACAF Gold Cup players
1993 CONCACAF Gold Cup players
2000 CONCACAF Gold Cup players
Jamaican expatriate footballers
Jamaican expatriate sportspeople in the United States
Expatriate soccer players in the United States